The 2000 Sanex WTA Tour was the 30th season since the founding of the Women's Tennis Association. It commenced on January 3, 2000, and concluded on November 13, 2000, after 58 events. For this season, a new event was added: the State Farm Classic in Scottsdale, Arizona, U.S. It also saw the return of the China Open which was moved to Shanghai, after last being held in Beijing in 1996.

Martina Hingis finished the season as the number one ranked player for the third time in four years, and second year in a row. However, this was the first year she finished number one without winning a Grand Slam women's singles title. Hingis led the titles list with nine throughout the season, including the prestigious WTA Tour Championships. Venus Williams won the most Grand Slam titles with two, and finished the year as the No. 3 player in the world. Williams also won the Olympic Gold medal in Sydney that year, and was awarded the Player of the Year award by the WTA. Mary Pierce won her second Grand Slam title five years after her last, becoming the first Frenchwoman to win at home since Françoise Dürr in 1967. Lindsay Davenport also picked up her third and last Grand Slam title at the Australian Open.

In doubles competition, the Grand Slam titles were split between four teams: Lisa Raymond and Rennae Stubbs, Martina Hingis and Mary Pierce, Serena Williams and Venus Williams, and Julie Halard-Decugis and Ai Sugiyama. The Williams sisters also won the Olympic Gold medal, and were thus awarded Doubles Team of the Year at the WTA Awards.

Schedule 
The table below shows the 2000 WTA Tour schedule.

Key

January

February

March

April

May

June

July

August

September

October

November

Rankings 
Below are the 2000 WTA year-end rankings:

Number 1 ranking

Statistics 
List of players and titles won, last name alphabetically:
  Martina Hingis – Tokyo, Miami, Hamburg, 's-Hertogenbosch, Montreal, Filderstadt, Zurich, Moscow and WTA Tour Championships (9)
  Venus Williams – Wimbledon, Stanford, San Diego and New Haven, U.S. Open and Sydney Olympics (6)
  Lindsay Davenport – Australian Open, Indian Wells, Linz and Philadelphia (4)
  Henrieta Nagyová – Warsaw, Palermo and Kuala Lumpur (3)
  Monica Seles – Oklahoma City, Amelia Island and Rome (3)
  Serena Williams – Hanover, Los Angeles and Tokyo Cup (3)
  Kim Clijsters – Hobart and Leipzig (2)
  Julie Halard-Decugis – Eastbourne and Tokyo Open (2)
  Anke Huber – Estoril and Sopot (2)
  Anne Kremer – Auckland and Pattaya City (2)
  Mary Pierce – Hilton Head and French Open (2)
  Silvija Talaja – Gold Coast and Strasbourg (2)
  Dája Bedáňová – Bratislava (1)
  Jennifer Capriati – Luxembourg (1)
  Amanda Coetzer – Antwerp (1)
  Tathiana Garbin – Budapest (1)
  Rita Kuti-Kis – São Paulo (1)
  Gala León García – Madrid (1)
  Conchita Martínez – Berlin (1)
  Amélie Mauresmo – Sydney (1)
  Tina Pisnik – Bol (1)
  Lisa Raymond – Birmingham (1)
  Chanda Rubin – Quebec City (1)
  Barbara Schett – Klagenfurt (1)
  Meghann Shaughnessy – Shanghai (1)
  Anna Smashnova – Knokke-Heist (1)
  Nathalie Tauziat – Paris (1)
  Iroda Tulyaganova – Tashkent (1)
  Patricia Wartusch – Bogotá (1)

The following players won their first title:
  Silvija Talaja – Gold Coast
  Anne Kremer – Auckland
  Patricia Wartusch – Bogotá
  Rita Kuti-Kis – São Paulo
  Tathiana Garbin – Budapest
  Tina Pisnik – Bol
  Gala León García – Madrid
  Iroda Tulyaganova – Tashkent
  Meghann Shaughnessy – Shanghai
  Dája Bedáňová – Bratislava

Titles won by nation:
  – 20 (Australian Open, Hanover, Oklahoma City, Indian Wells, Amelia Island, Rome, Birmingham, Wimbledon, Stanford, San Diego, Los Angeles, New Haven, U.S. Open, Sydney Olympics, Luxembourg, Tokyo Cup, Linz, Shanghai, Quebec City and Philadelphia)
  – 9 (Tokyo, Miami, Hamburg, 's-Hertogenbosch, Montreal, Filderstadt, Zurich, Moscow and WTA Tour Championships)
  – 6 (Sydney, Paris, Hilton Head, French Open, Eastbourne and Tokyo Open)
  – 3 (Warsaw, Palermo and Kuala Lumpur)
  – 2 (Bogotá and Klagenfurt)
  – 2 (Hobart and Leipzig)
  – 2 (Gold Coast and Strasbourg)
  – 2 (Estoril and Sopot)
  – 2 (Auckland and Pattaya City)
  – 2 (Berlin and Madrid)
  – 1 (Bratislava)
  – 1 (São Paulo)
  – 1 (Knokke-Heist)
  – 1 (Budapest)
  – 1 (Antwerp)
  – 1 (Bol)
  – 1 (Tashkent)

See also 
 2000 ATP Tour
 WTA Tour
 List of female tennis players
 List of tennis tournaments

External links 
 Women's Tennis Association (WTA) official website

 
WTA Tour
WTA Tour seasons